The 2010 AFC Champions League group stage matches took place between 23 February and 28 April 2010.

Groups

Group A

Group B

Group C

Group D

Group E

Group F

Group G

Group H

References

Group stage